The Wobblies: The Story of Syndicalism in the United States is a 1967 history book by Patrick Renshaw on the American history of the Industrial Workers of the World.

Bibliography

External links 

 Full text at the Internet Archive

1967 non-fiction books
English-language books
Industrial Workers of the World in the United States
Doubleday (publisher) books